Nicolás Guillermo Minici (born 23 August 1984) is an Argentine professional footballer who plays as a defender or midfielder.

Career
Minici's senior career began in 2003, and he played seventeen times for UAI Urquiza in Primera D Metropolitana. A move followed in 2004 to Fénix, which won the league, prior to Minici staying in Primera C Metropolitana after agreeing terms with Acassuso in 2006. That club won promotion as champions in 2006–07, therefore earning a spot in Primera B Metropolitana for 2007–08. Having featured twenty-one times and scored thrice in the next season, Minici joined fellow third tier club Deportivo Español in 2008. Twenty-three appearances for them followed, which led to Primera División side Racing Club signing him in 2009.

Minici left Racing Club months later after not appearing in their first-team, subsequently joining Los Andes on 31 January 2010. Minici then completed a move to Deportivo Merlo less than eight months later, followed by a spell with Primera B Nacional's Gimnasia y Esgrima in 2011–12. He scored goals against Defensa y Justicia and eventual champions River Plate in the aforementioned season. Minici joined Huracán in July 2012, making his debut in a 3–1 loss to Aldosivi and appearing in a total of seventeen matches for them. After one campaign in the ranks of Huracán, Minici departed to return to a former club of his - Acassuso.

Seventy-one games and eleven goals followed with Acassuso, though they came in two stints on either side of a six-month spell with Guaraní Antonio Franco of tier two to conclude 2014. In January 2016, Minici agreed to sign for Deportivo Morón. He remained for 2016 and 2016–17, with the latter culminating with the defender's third senior title win. Minici, however, stayed in Primera B Metropolitana as he moved to Barracas Central. His first appearance came against former team Acassuso in September 2017, while his first goal occurred against Deportivo Español, whom he had spent time with in 2008 and 2009.

Career statistics
.

Honours
Fénix
Primera D Metropolitana: 2004–05

Acassuso
Primera C Metropolitana: 2006–07

Deportivo Morón
Primera B Metropolitana: 2016–17

Barracas Central
Primera B Metropolitana: 2018–19

References

External links

1984 births
Living people
Footballers from Buenos Aires
Argentine footballers
Association football defenders
Association football midfielders
Primera D Metropolitana players
Primera C Metropolitana players
Primera B Metropolitana players
Primera Nacional players
UAI Urquiza players
Club Atlético Fénix players
Club Atlético Acassuso footballers
Deportivo Español footballers
Racing Club de Avellaneda footballers
Club Atlético Los Andes footballers
Deportivo Merlo footballers
Gimnasia y Esgrima de Jujuy footballers
Club Atlético Huracán footballers
Guaraní Antonio Franco footballers
Deportivo Morón footballers
Barracas Central players